Johan Forssell (in parliament called Forssell in Kolbäck, later Forssell Hallstahammar), born 16 March 1855 in Hökhuvud, died 18 September 1914 in Svedvi, was a Swedish school teacher and politician (Liberal, later Social Democrat).

Johan Forssell appeared in Kolbäck as a primary school teacher from 1878. He was a Member of Parliament of Sweden in the second chamber 1903-1905 and 1909-1914, up until 1911 for Västmanland County southern circuit constituency and from 1912 to Västmanland county west constituency. During the period, 1903-1905, he belonged to the Liberal-Conservative Party, but he belonged later to the Social Democrats and re-elected at the election in 1908 as its representative. In the Parliament Johan Forssell including deputy in bankoutskottet 1912-1914 and a member of the same committee in 1914. He became involved in, among other things, reduced government spending.

Johan Forssell was also a beekeeper, as described in the December 3, 1896 issue of the British Bee Journal.

References 

1855 births
1914 deaths
Members of the Andra kammaren